Ahmed Al-Alwani (born 19 August 1981) is a Libyan footballer who plays for Ahly Benghazi as a defensive midfielder. He is a member of the Libyan national football team, and was called up to the 2012 Africa Cup of Nations as a reserve player.

References

External links
 

1981 births
Living people
Libyan footballers
Libya international footballers
Association football midfielders
2012 Africa Cup of Nations players
Libya A' international footballers
2014 African Nations Championship players